Douglas L. Gutwein is a Republican member of the Indiana House of Representatives, representing the 16th District since 2008. He has supported "right-to-work" legislation in Indiana. He retired in 2022.

Early life
Gutwein was born in Francesville, Indiana.  After graduating from high school, Gutwein served in the US Army for 3 years. During his 3 years he was stationed in Frankfort, Germany and Vietnam. After his service, Gutwein decided to become a city mail carrier in Valparaiso and California.

1979
In 1979 Gutwein returned to Francesville to run his brother's company. Gutwein, several years later, bought out his brother's company.

1992
In 1992 Gutwein was voted president of the town board. The board's main focuses and accomplishments consisted of reformation of zoning laws, a sewer system, an expansion of the public library and increased funding through the Build Indiana program. With the extra money, the board was able to expand not only the size of the town hall but also the police department, the water and sewer department, and the fire department.

Organizations
Gutwein is a member of the American Legion.

Personal life 
Gutwein and his wife Mary Lew have been married for 33 years.  Together the two have two children and three grandchildren.

References

External links
Douglas Gutwein at Ballotpedia
Representative Douglas Gutwein official Indiana State Legislature site
 

Living people
Republican Party members of the Indiana House of Representatives
21st-century American politicians
Year of birth missing (living people)
United States Army soldiers
People from Pulaski County, Indiana